Sumerduck Historic District is a national historic district located at Sumerduck, Fauquier County, Virginia.  It encompasses 19 contributing buildings and 1 contributing site in the rural hamlet of Sumerduck.  The Reconstruction-era district includes dwellings that date from the late-19th to the mid-20th centuries, stores, churches, a post office, a school, and a public space for meetings.  Notable buildings include the Tulloss House (c. 1882), the Henry Broadus Jones House also known as the Santa Claus House or the House of the Seven Gables (c. 1885), the restored Embrey-Mills House (1880s), the Steven Jacobs House (c. 1940), the Union Primitive Baptist Church (c. 1898), Sumerduck Baptist Church (1915), a former school (1887), and Sumerduck Trading Company (c. 1950).

It was listed on the National Register of Historic Places in 2009.

Gallery

References

Historic districts in Fauquier County, Virginia
Carpenter Gothic architecture in Virginia
National Register of Historic Places in Fauquier County, Virginia
Historic districts on the National Register of Historic Places in Virginia